Paul Szczechura (born November 30, 1985) is a Canadian professional ice hockey forward. He is currently an unrestricted free agent who most recently played for Torpedo Nizhny Novgorod of the Kontinental Hockey League (KHL).

Early life
Szczechura grew up in the small town of Brantford, Ontario which is the hometown of other professional hockey players such as Wayne Gretzky, Pat Hickey, Chris Gratton, Keith Jones and Adam Henrique. He is of Polish descent.

Playing career
Szczechura grew up playing hockey in his hometown of Brantford playing minor hockey for both the Brantford Saints and Brant Bandits AAA hockey programs. He played in the 1999 Quebec International Pee-Wee Hockey Tournament with Brantford. After being drafted in the 11th round of the 2001 OHL Priority Selection by the Barrie Colts, Szczechura decided to pursue an NCAA scholarship and played three seasons with the Brantford Golden Eagles of the OHA Midwestern Ontario Jr.B. League. He accepted a scholarship to Western Michigan University in 2003.

Previously, Szczechura played for Western Michigan University (CCHA), the Iowa Stars (AHL) and the Norfolk Admirals (AHL). He signed with the Lightning as a free agent on April 24, 2008, and debuted against the Philadelphia Flyers on December 2, 2008. He scored his first NHL goal against Tim Thomas of the Boston Bruins on December 8, 2008. Szczechura scored his second career goal and assisted on another Lightning goal on December 23, 2008 against the Pittsburgh Penguins, and was named the first star of the game. He was later signed by the Buffalo Sabres to play with their AHL affiliate, the Rochester Americans. On November 26, 2011, the Sabres recalled Szczechura.

On May 22, 2012, it was announced that Szczechura signed a one-year contract to join Czech team, HC Lev, for their first foray into the Kontinental Hockey League. Szczechura appeared in three games to start the 2012–13 season, before losing his place in the high flying Lev squad. On September 26, 2012, Szczechura signed contract to transfer over with fellow KHL, club Dinamo Riga. After two seasons, in May 2014 he signed a two-year contract with HC Dinamo Minsk. After his contract had expired, he moved fellow to KHL outfit Traktor Chelyabinsk, signing in May 2016.

As a free agent from Chelyabinsk after three seasons, Szczechura extended his KHL career in agreeing to a one-year contract with his fifth KHL club, Torpedo Nizhny Novgorod on July 16, 2019.

Career statistics

References

External links

1985 births
Living people
Buffalo Sabres players
Canadian people of Polish descent
Canadian ice hockey centres
Dinamo Riga players
Iowa Stars players
HC Lev Praha players
HC Dinamo Minsk players
Norfolk Admirals players
Rochester Americans players
Tampa Bay Lightning players
Torpedo Nizhny Novgorod players
Traktor Chelyabinsk players
Undrafted National Hockey League players
Western Michigan Broncos men's ice hockey players
Ice hockey people from Ontario
Sportspeople from Brantford
Canadian expatriate ice hockey players in the Czech Republic
Canadian expatriate ice hockey players in Belarus
Canadian expatriate ice hockey players in Latvia
Canadian expatriate ice hockey players in Russia
Canadian expatriate ice hockey players in the United States
Canadian expatriate ice hockey players in Poland
GKS Tychy players